Banu Khalaf (also Romanized as Banū Khalaf; also known as Banī Khalaf and Banī Khalal) is a village in Baryaji Rural District, in the Central District of Sardasht County, West Azerbaijan Province, Iran. At the 2006 census, its population was 394, in 69 families.

References 

Populated places in Sardasht County